Progressive revelation may refer to:

Progressive revelation (Bahá'í), a core teaching of the Bahá'í Faith, that suggests that religious truth is revealed by God progressively and cyclically over time
Progressive revelation (Christianity), the concept that the sections of the Bible that were written later contain a fuller revelation of God compared to the earlier sections